Jack Liam Ryan (born 5 April 1996) is an English footballer who plays for  side Stalybridge Celtic, where he played as a forward.

Playing career

Preston North End
Ryan attended the Blackburn Rovers Academy before being released. He joined the Preston North End youth set-up after a month-long trial in 2012. He turned professional with 'the lilywhites' in July 2014, having spent time on loan at Stalybridge Celtic in the 2013–14 season. He returned on loan to the Conference North with Stockport County at the start of the 2014–15 campaign. He made his debut in the Football League on 4 October 2014, coming on for Joe Garner late into a 4–2 victory over Colchester United at Deepdale.

Morecambe (loan)
On 5 August 2015, he joined Morecambe on loan until 31 October 2015. After playing just 41 minutes over three appearances for Morecambe, he returned to Preston. On 20 October, Ryan went out on loan again but this time to National League club Southport.

Bradford (Park Avenue)
Following his release from Preston North End in 2016, Ryan signed for Bradford (Park Avenue).

Workington
In November 2016, Ryan was released from his contract in order to sign for Workington.

Guiseley
Jack returned to English football, and signed for National League North side Guiseley on 3 October 2020.

Tamworth

Ryan soon departed Guiseley and signed for Southern League Premier Division Central side Tamworth on 16 October 2020.

Jack made his debut for Tamworth on 17 October 2020, in a Southern League Premier Division Central fixture at home to Royston Town, the match finished 1-1.

Ryan started the following Southern League Premier Division Central fixture at home to Biggleswade Town on 24 October 2020, and scored the first goal in a 3-0 victory for the home side.

Stalybridge Celtic
Ryan signed for Northern Premier League Premier Division side Stalybridge Celtic on 23 July 2021.  He left the club in September 2021.

Career statistics

Club

References

External links

1996 births
Living people
Footballers from Barrow-in-Furness
English footballers
Association football forwards
Blackburn Rovers F.C. players
Preston North End F.C. players
Stalybridge Celtic F.C. players
Stockport County F.C. players
Morecambe F.C. players
Southport F.C. players
Bradford (Park Avenue) A.F.C. players
Workington A.F.C. players
Tamworth F.C. players
English Football League players
National League (English football) players
Expatriate soccer players in Australia
Northern Premier League players
Footballers from Cumbria